The Cyp11a2 is a fish gene encoding a CYP450 monooxygenase, which was originally identified in Zebrafish (Danio rerio), is the isozyme and paralogous of fish CYP11A1, catalyzes conversion of cholesterol to pregnenolone.

References 

11
fish